The Last Tango is a 1918 silent film directed by Vyacheslav Viskovsky.

Plot 

The film is based on the words of a song performed by Iza Kremer in Odessa.

Starring 
 A. Aleksandrov as Kellner
 Vera Kholodnaya as Chloe
 Ivan Khudoleyev as Sir Stone
 Ossip Runitsch as Joe

References

External links 

1918 films
1910s Russian-language films
Russian silent films
Russian black-and-white films